James Marshall (born May 22, 1968), also known as Dalek, is an American artist and designer based in Raleigh, North Carolina. Dalek has published two books featuring his artwork and been included in many other books and magazines.  His artwork has appeared on a wide variety of media, including sneakers, sculptures, and a Scion car.

Perhaps Dalek's most recognizable work is his Space Monkey, a "grinning and malevolent" character, his own vision of a human being.

References

Primary sources
Dalek. Sonic Order Of Happiness. Brooklyn: powerHouse, 2005. 
Marshall, James and Roger Gastman. Dalek Nickel-Plated Angels. Berkeley: Gingko Press, 2003. 
Marshall, James. His Majesty Fallacy. Drago Publishing, 2009. 

School of the Art Institute of Chicago alumni
American contemporary painters
20th-century American painters
American male painters
21st-century American painters
American graphic designers
American graffiti artists
1968 births
Living people
20th-century American male artists